Joseph-Léon-Vital Mallette (16 September 1888 – 17 April 1939) was a Liberal party member of the House of Commons of Canada. He was born in Pointe-Claire, Quebec and became a miller and secretary-treasurer.

Mallette was mayor of Pointe-Claire, Quebec from 1923 to 1927, after terms as a community alderman from 1915 to 1917 and from 1922 to 1923.

He was elected to Parliament at the Jacques Cartier riding in the 1935 general election. In 1937, Mallette spoke in the House of Commons of the representative politics that followed the Lower Canada Rebellion a century earlier, in which his grandfather was a Patriote. His speech carried an implied charge that Prime Minister William Lyon Mackenzie King had ignored the centennial of the rebellion.

Before he was able to complete his first term, the 18th Canadian Parliament, Mallette died on 17 April 1939 after he collapsed while crossing a Montreal street.

Electoral record

References

External links 
 

1888 births
1939 deaths
Liberal Party of Canada MPs
Mayors of places in Quebec
Members of the House of Commons of Canada from Quebec
People from Pointe-Claire